George D. Webster may refer to:

 George Webster (American football) (1945–2007), American gridiron football player
 George D. Webster (USMC) (1919–1992), United States Marine Corps general